Enaeta leonardhilli is a species of sea snail, a marine gastropod mollusk in the family Volutidae, the volutes.

Description
A small species, attaining no more than about 15-20 mm. in size.

Distribution
This species occurs in the Atlantic Ocean off Brazil and the Fernando de Noronha Islands.

References

 Bail, P & Poppe, G. T. 2001. A conchological iconography: a taxonomic introduction of the recent Volutidae. Hackenheim-Conchbook, 30 pp, 5 pl.

Volutidae
Gastropods described in 1982